Rafael Moreira is a musician.

Rafael Moreira may also refer to:

Rafael Moreira (footballer)
Rafael Moreira, character in 3%